A combat medical technician (CMT) is a soldier with a specialist military trade within the Royal Army Medical Corps of the British Army.

Role
The fully trained combat medical technician or CMT is capable of:
assisting with the management of surgical, medical and psychiatric casualties from the onset of the condition until the casualty is admitted to a hospital offering specialist care. This capacity is to include the immediate necessary first aid and other sustaining procedures required to hold a casualty for a limited period in a non-hospital situation.
undertaking the administrative procedures and documentation for casualties in field units, medical reception stations and unit medical centres, including those required for and during casualty

Class 3 and 2 standards
Trained in anatomy, physiology and first aid.
Has a general understanding of medical terminology and is capable of carrying out first aid in an emergency situation until expert medical assistance is available
Works under supervision to provide assistance to medical officers in field units and medical reception stations.
Assists in setting up field medical units and is trained in medical fieldcraft including the use of radio equipment, navigation by foot or vehicle across country and field medical equipment
Capable of carrying out basic nursing procedures
Initiates and maintains casualty documentation and supply/equipment documentation
Recognises abnormalities in casualty observations, body appearances and consciousness levels
Trained in basic life support (BLS) to UK Resuscitation Council guidelines
Trained in Army environmental health issues at unit level

Class 1 standard
As for Class 2 and 3, but with additional training and experience (see above)
Provides health advice to non medical junior commanders
Has a good understanding of anatomy and physiology
Is able to take control of an emergency situation
Is trained in basic diagnostic techniques and able to report findings to medical services
Advises on basic field hygiene
Capable of advanced first aid and using advanced resuscitation techniques
Administers non-controlled drugs ordered by a medical officer
Administers drugs by oral route, inhalations, plus intradermal-, intramuscular- and subcutaneous injection
Sutures simple wounds
Maintains, or supervises the maintenance of, and indents for medical equipment
Trains junior medical assistants

Additionally, at Class 1 the CMT is trained in the procedures and principles of Battlefield Advanced Trauma Life Support (BATLS), which includes advanced life support, cricothyrotomy and thoracentesis.

Further progression by rank
At the rank of corporal, the combat medical technician also supervises and controls medical assistants working in medical unit departments, such as medical section  2 i/c in a close support (CS) medical regiment.
At the rank of sergeant or staff sergeant, the combat medical technician takes charge of a department, accounting for equipment and carrying out the administrative duties for soldiers within the department, medical section commander in a close support (CS) medical regiment or a role 2 medical treatment facility within a general support (GS) medical regiment. 
At the rank of warrant officer, the combat medical technician supervises a number of departments, and maintains discipline and morale within those departments, providing for the efficiency and effectiveness of the unit.

See also
 Medical Assistant (Royal Navy)
 Royal Army Medical Corps
 Battlefield medicine
 Military medicine
 Medic
 Combat medic
 Flight medic
 Ambulance#Military use
 Michelle Norris

References

Army Form B6360 Rev 10/99
British Army site

External links
 Army Medic home page
 Corpsman.com, a site run by docs for docs, of all US military services
 Virtual Naval Hospital - a digital library of military medicine and humanitarian medicine

British Army specialisms
Military medicine in the United Kingdom
Royal Army Medical Corps